The Lorne Pierce Medal is awarded every two years by the Royal Society of Canada to recognize achievement of special significance and conspicuous merit in imaginative or critical literature written in either English or French. The medal was first awarded in 1926. The award itself consists of a gold-plated silver medal and is currently awarded every two years if there is a suitable candidate. (Between 1926 and 1964 it was awarded annually.) The award bears the name of Lorne Pierce (1890–1961), who was editor of Ryerson Press for forty years, contributing greatly to the development and appreciation of Canadian literature, and who originally established the award.

Recipients
Source: Royal Society of Canada

References
 List of past Lorne Pierce Medallists at the Royal Society of Canada site

Canadian literary awards
Awards established in 1926
1926 establishments in Canada
Literary awards honoring writers
Royal Society of Canada